Urviș or Urvișu may refer to several places in Romania:

 Urvișu de Beliu, a village in Hășmaș Commune, Arad County
 Urviș de Beiuș, a village in Șoimi Commune, Bihor County
Urviș (river), a tributary of the Beliu in Arad County